Class Editori S.p.A. is an Italian media conglomerate that is based in Milan and listed on the Italian Stock Exchange since November 30, 1998. It is also active in the field of television, radio and video information systems (Telesia Sistemi) broadcast in the main airports and in the Rome and Milan metros.

Overview
Founded in 1986 by Paolo Panerai, the publisher is primarily devoted to financial and lifestyle news.

The group publishes the following magazines and newspapers in Italy:
 MF Milano Finanza
 Italia Oggi
 Capital
 Class
 Luna
 Gentleman
 Campus
 Case & Country
 Patrimoni
 Global Finance

The company operates three television channels on satellite in Italy:
 Class News
 Class TV Moda available on Eutelsat Hot Bird free to air
 Class CNBC (joint venture with NBC Universal and Mediaset)

Class Editori's other ventures include the news agency MF Dow Jones News (a joint venture with Dow Jones), the classical radio station Radio Classica.

References

External links
  Official site

 
Publishing companies established in 1986
Publishing companies of Italy
Companies based in Milan
Italian-language television networks
Mass media in Milan
Italian companies established in 1986